Anders Thomas Jensen (born 6 April 1972) is a Danish screenwriter and film director. His film Election Night won the 1998 Academy Award for Best Live Action Short Film.

Life and career 
Jensen was born in Frederiksværk. He won the Oscar for Best Short Subject for his 1998 film Election Night. He received Oscar nominations in the live-action short category for his films Ernst & Lyset (1996) and Wolfgang (1997). He also wrote the script for After the Wedding which was nominated for an Oscar as Best Foreign film in 2007, The New Tenants, which won the 2009 Oscar for Best Live Action Short and In a Better World which won the Oscar for Best Foreign film in 2011 and the Golden Globe for Best Foreign film.

From the end of the 1990s and into the new millennium he wrote the screenplays for most of the Danish movie blockbusters of the period, including Mifune's Last Song (co-written with Søren Kragh-Jacobsen), In China They Eat Dogs, Open Hearts, Stealing Rembrandt, and Brothers.

In 2000 Anders Thomas Jensen for the first time directed a feature film: the action-comedy Flickering Lights, and since then directed The Green Butchers, Adam's Apples, Men & Chicken and Riders of Justice.

Jensen co-wrote the film  The Dark Tower with Nikolaj Arcel, Akiva Goldsman, and Jeff Pinkner, based on the Stephen King series. It was Jensen's first work on an American screenplay.

Filmography

References

External links 
 

1972 births
Directors of Live Action Short Film Academy Award winners
Danish male screenwriters
Living people
Danish film directors
People from Frederiksværk
Bodil Honorary Award recipients